Khandamouda is a village in Jharkhand, India. It has a population of nearly 4,000.

Nearby villages are Baharagora Parulia Kumardubi Panchrulia Khamar Digbarda etc.

References

Villages in East Singhbhum district